Alan Roger Davies (born 6 March 1966) is an English stand-up comedian, writer, actor and TV presenter. He is best known for his portrayal of the title role in the BBC mystery drama series Jonathan Creek (1997–2016) and as the only permanent panellist on the BBC panel show QI since its premiere in 2003, outlasting its original host Stephen Fry.

Early life
Davies was born in Loughton, Essex, and spent his childhood years in Chingford. When Davies was six his mother died from leukaemia and he was raised by his father. He was sexually abused by his father from age 8 to 13, as described in his book Just Ignore Him. Davies also wrote that his brother and sister were turned against him, which began his strong desire to please others. This led him to shoplift for schoolmates and play the joker at home.

Davies attended Staples Road School in Loughton and was privately educated at the private Bancroft's School in Woodford Green, where he gained eight O-Levels. He then moved on to Loughton College of Further Education where he gained four more O-Levels and two A-Levels (Communications & Theatre Studies). He graduated in Drama & Theatre Studies from the University of Kent in 1988, and was awarded an honorary doctorate by the university in 2003.

Career

Stand-up
Davies began performing comedy in 1988 at the Whitstable Labour Club. In 1991, he was named Time Outs Best Young Comic. He continued touring and performing in the UK and Australia, winning the Edinburgh Festival Critics Award for Comedy in 1994. That show was released on video and audio cassette in 1995 as Alan Davies Live at the Lyric recorded at the Lyric Theatre as part of the Perrier Pick of the Fringe season in October 1994.

A version of his show "Urban Trauma", which ran in the West End at the Duchess Theatre and toured the UK and Australia, was shown on BBC One in 1998.

In 2012, Davies planned a new tour called "Life is Pain". The title for this show came from a story he heard about a six-year-old girl being told off by her mother and responding "Life is pain". Davies said "This really made me laugh". The tour was broadcast on Dave.

Radio and television
In 1994 and 1995, Davies hosted Alan's Big One for three series on Radio 1 before appearing in Channel 4's spoof travel show One for the Road (made by Channel X in 1994/5).

From 1997 to 2016 he played the title role in Jonathan Creek, a trick-deviser for a stage magician, with a side interest in solving crimes. Jonathan Creek won a BAFTA for Best Drama and brought Davies to mainstream attention. The series ran semi-regularly between 1997 and 2004 before returning on New Year's Day 2009, with a special episode titled "The Grinning Man", was broadcast on the BBC. Further specials were aired in 2010 ("The Judas Tree") and 2013 ("The Clue of the Savant's Thumb").

Davies co-wrote and starred in his own radio sitcom, The Alan Davies Show, in 1998. Cassettes of the show were produced and released by the BBC, with episodes broadcast on the digital radio station BBC7. He played Russell Boyd in the BBC comedy A Many Splintered Thing, also in 1998 and 2000.

In 2001, Davies played Robert Gossage in Bob and Rose, a comedy drama about a gay man falling for a woman. He won the Best Actor award at the Monte Carlo TV Festival for his performance. He also played Jack the dog in the radio sitcom About a Dog. In 2003, Davies appeared as a Star in a Reasonably-Priced Car on Top Gear with a time of 1:54 in wet conditions. He returned in Series 8 with 1:50.3 in dry conditions. During a period from the mid-1990s to 2002, Davies advertised for Abbey National.

Davies took on a less comedic role in 2004, starring as Henry Farmer, a maverick barrister, in ITV Sunday night drama The Brief, for two series. Subsequent drama roles include Superintendent Mallard in Agatha Christie's Marple (ITV, 2008), as well as appearances in The Good Housekeeping Guide (BBC One, 2006), Roman Road (ITV 2004) and Hotel Babylon (BBC One, 2008).

He argued the case for John Lennon as the greatest Briton of all time on the BBC's Great Britons series in 2002. In 2007, Davies starred in the second episode of ITV's You Don't Know You're Born and on The Unbelievable Truth.

He has appeared in an episode of the BBC science programme Horizon in which Professor Marcus du Sautoy attempted to introduce him to elements of mathematical thought which was broadcast on BBC Two on 31 March 2009. He went on to appear in Horizon for a second time in November 2009, this time leading the episode — du Sautoy also returned as a guest speaker.

On 16 May 2010, Davies appeared in "Your Sudden Death Question", an episode of the ITV detective series Lewis, as Marcus Richard, a scamming quizmaster at a competition held in an Oxford college, at which some of the contestants are murdered. In September 2010, he began a three-part documentary series Alan Davies' Teenage Revolution (Channel 4), partly based on his autobiographical book My Favourite People and Me, 1978–88.

In September 2010, a BBC comedy series entitled Whites starring Davies as a chef premiered. It was however cancelled after this first series. It is believed to have been a victim of the cuts at the BBC subsequent to the reduced licence fee settlement.

In April 2011, Davies appeared as the guest on the return of the ABC TV conversation program A Quiet Word With .... In 2011 Davies was also one of the judges on the ITV programme Show Me The Funny, a talent contest for new and aspiring stand-up comedy performers.

In September 2012, Davies made his first appearance on Channel 4's Big Fat Quiz series, winning The Big Fat Quiz of the '90s alongside Phill Jupitus.

In February 2014, Davies presented a chat show Alan Davies Après-Ski on BBC Two, which looked at some of the highlights of the 2014 Winter Olympic Games. He also co-hosted the Brazilian Banter podcast for ITV with Tom & Dom from Bantams Banter. The show was a satirical look at the 2014 FIFA World Cup hosted by Brazil.

Since 2014, he has hosted The Dog Rescuers for Channel 5 and the chat show Alan Davies: As Yet Untitled for Dave.

QI

Davies appears as the only permanent panellist on the BBC Two comedy quiz game QI, which was hosted by Stephen Fry from 2003 to 2015, and then by Sandi Toksvig. He also contributed "four words" to the QI book The Book of General Ignorance (which appear after Stephen Fry's foreword), "Will this do, Stephen?". Davies has appeared in almost every regular episode of the show, though in one episode (Episode 10 of Series D, "Divination") he appeared, pre-recorded, in only the first few minutes, as he was in Paris attending the UEFA Champions League Final between Barcelona and his beloved Arsenal during the recording. His chair was empty for the rest of the episode, although his voice was heard during "General Ignorance". He also did not appear in the 2011 Comic Relief episode, when his seat was taken by David Walliams. During the filming of the QI Christmas episode 2020, Davies set the new Guinness World Record for the most Christmas crackers pulled by an individual in 30 seconds, achieving 35 successful cracks. His record stood until Joel Corry achieved 41 successful cracks at Capital's Jingle Bell Ball on 12 December 2021.

Books
Davies's first book, the autobiographical My Favourite People and Me, 1978–88 was published by Michael Joseph (Penguin Books) in September 2009. Of the memoir, Davies said he wished to "attempt to remember what I liked as a boy/youth/idiot and to work out why". The favourite people referred to in the title include Anton Chekhov, John Belushi, Barry Sheene, Margaret Thatcher ("only for a few days" the author allows), John McEnroe and Starsky and Hutch. The book also mentions Arsenal F.C., the football team supported by Davies; he recalls as a child his mother sewing their club badge and captain's number onto his shirt, done only a year or so before she died. The paperback was published under the title Rebel Without A Clue: How the 80s Made Me.

His second memoir and autobiography, Just Ignore Him was published in September 2020. The book details the sexual abuse that he suffered as a boy from his father between the ages of 8 and 13. In adulthood both the police and the CPS accepted Davies' abuse accusations but declined to prosecute his father Roy Davies, due to his Alzheimer's disease and his by then advancing years. Davies promoted the book during a BBC Radio 5 Live interview, first broadcast on 9 December 2020.

Personal life
Davies married Katie Maskell, a writer, on 13 January 2007 after a six-month engagement. The couple first met backstage at QI in 2005. Friend and comedy partner Bill Bailey was Davies' best man. The couple have three children.

Davies is a pescatarian. He narrated an anti-vivisection video for Animal Aid called Wasted Lives in 2006.

In late 2007, The Times and The Daily Telegraph both reported that Davies bit the ear of a homeless man. Davies had just left a wake at the nearby Groucho Club. He told The Times in 2009, "He wasn't a tramp. He was a raging, horrendous arsehole. He called me a cunt several times. Or if it wasn't him, it was his mate. And, yes, I went for him and, yes, I did it in what turned out to be an amusing way." Following the incident, Davies was banned from the Groucho Club.

Davies is a lifelong fan and season ticket holder of Arsenal F.C. Davies also used to host the podcast "It's Up For Grabs Now", which took a light-hearted look at goings on at the club. On 18 January 2011, he began hosting the new Arsenal Podcast "The Tuesday Club" with Ian Stone, Keith Dover, Tayo Popoola and Damian Harris. Releases of the podcast ceased in August 2018, but returned in April 2020 on a (mostly) weekly basis. His support of Arsenal has been used as a recurring source of humour on QI in various ways, such as by assigning him a buzzer sound of a chant by fans of rival club Manchester United.

He is a supporter of the Labour Party, saying to Saga magazine in 2013: "Social injustice is important to me. Life isn't about every man for himself. Life should be about co-operation and collaboration." Despite initially voting for Jeremy Corbyn to be party leader, when being interviewed by Radio Times alongside fellow comedian Jo Brand regarding the broadcast of his Channel 4 sitcom Damned (which coincided with the 2016 Labour leadership election), Davies supported Owen Smith's leadership bid, saying Corbyn was an ineffective Leader of the Opposition.

In 2016, he pursued a Master of Arts degree in Creative Writing at Goldsmiths College, which he completed in September 2018.

Filmography

Television

Film

Stand-up VHS and DVDs
Urban Trauma (1998)
Life is Pain: Live in London (18 November 2013)
Little Victories (28 November 2016)

References

External links

 
 
 

1966 births
20th-century English comedians
20th-century English male actors
20th-century English male writers
21st-century English comedians
21st-century English male actors
21st-century English male writers
21st-century English memoirists
Alumni of the University of Kent
Comedians from Essex
English atheists
English male comedians
English male radio actors
English male television actors
English podcasters
English television talk show hosts
Living people
Male actors from Essex
Male actors from London
People educated at Bancroft's School
People from Chingford
People from Loughton
QI
Television personalities from Essex
Writers from London